Occidental may refer to:

 Western world (of or pertaining to)

Places
Occidental, California, a town in Sonoma County, California, US
 Occidental Park (Seattle)

Other uses
 Interlingue, a constructed language formerly known as Occidental
 Occidental College, located in Los Angeles, California, US
 Occidental Life Insurance Company, a former American insurer
 Occidental Petroleum, an American oil company
 Occidental Observer, far-right online publication
 The Occidental Quarterly, an American racialist journal

See also
 Cordillera Occidental (disambiguation)
 Davao Occidental, a province in the Philippines located in the Davao Region in Mindanao
 Misamis Occidental, a province of the Philippines located in the Northern Mindanao region
 Negros Occidental, a province of the Philippines located in the Western Visayas Region 
 Occident (disambiguation)
 Occidental Mindoro, a province of the Philippines located in MIMAROPA in Luzon
 Sierra Madre Occidental, a major mountain range in Western Mexico